{{Infobox sportsperson
| name = Abdalelah Haroun
| image = Abdalelah Haroun London 2017.jpg
| image_size = 220
| alt = 
| caption = Haroun at the 2017 World Championships
| native_name = عبد الإله هارون
| native_name_lang = ar
| nationality = SudaneseQatari
| birth_date = 1 January 1997
| birth_place = Al-Soki, Sennar, Sudan
| death_date = 
| death_place = Doha, Qatar
| years_active = 
| height = 1.85 m
| weight = 80 kg
| country = 
| sport = Athletics
| event = 400 metres
| club = 
| turnedpro = 
| coach = Luiz de Oliveira
| pb = 400 m: 44.07  (2018)500 m(indoors): 59.83 WB (Stockholm 2016)
| show-medals = yes
| medaltemplates = 

}}Abdalelah Haroun Hassan''' (1 January 1997 – 26 June 2021) was a Qatari track and field sprinter. He specialised in the 400 metres. He was the 2015 Asian champion in the event and holds the Asian indoor record.

Biography
Haroun was recruited at a young age from Sudan by Qatar. He gained eligibility to represent Qatar in February 2015. His first recorded performance was a time of 45.74 seconds for the 400 m in Doha in April 2014, which placed him among the world's most promising young sprinters for the event. He announced himself on the elite scene in his next performance at the XL Galan in February 2015 by running an Asian indoor record of 45.39 seconds, which was also the third fastest ever by a junior category athlete and the fastest ever indoor debut. His next outing one month later he set an outdoor best of 44.68 seconds. He was a comfortable victor at the 2015 Arab Athletics Championships in April, beating Egypt's Anas Beshr by nearly a second.

He ran at the Doha Diamond League meeting and won the non-Diamond-race contest with another sub-45-second run. On his IAAF Diamond League debut proper, he finished fifth at the Prefontaine Classic. He quickly established himself as one of Asia's top senior athletes at the 2015 Asian Athletics Championships by beating two-time defending champion Yousef Masrahi of Saudi Arabia in the 400 m final with his third 44.68-second clocking of the season. Masrahi was indignant about losing to his younger rival, saying "44.68 is nothing for me actually. I will come back. I will break the Asian record again".

On June 26, 2021, Haroun died in a car crash in Doha, at the age of 24.

Personal bests
400 metres outdoors: 44.07 seconds (2018)
400 metres indoors: 45.39 seconds (2015) 
4 × 400 metres relay: 3:00.56 (2018)

International competitions

References

External links
 
 

1997 births
2021 deaths

Qatari male sprinters
Sudanese male sprinters
Athletes (track and field) at the 2016 Summer Olympics
Olympic athletes of Qatar
Asian Games gold medalists for Qatar
Asian Games gold medalists in athletics (track and field)
Athletes (track and field) at the 2018 Asian Games
Medalists at the 2018 Asian Games
World Athletics Championships athletes for Qatar
World Athletics Championships medalists
World Athletics Indoor Championships medalists
IAAF Continental Cup winners
Asian Athletics Championships winners
Asian Indoor Athletics Championships winners
Qatari people of Sudanese descent
Sudanese emigrants to Qatar
Naturalised citizens of Qatar
Road incident deaths in Qatar